Zirconium stearate is a metal-organic compound, a salt of zirconium and stearic acid with the chemical formula .

The compound is classified as a metallic soap, i.e. a metal derivative of a fatty acid.

Synthesis
Zirconium stearate is prepared by boiling stearic acid and sodium carbonate in water and then adding zirconium oxychloride solution.

Also, zirconium stearate can be prepared by reacting zirconium nitrate and sodium oleate.

Physical properties
The compound forms white powder.

Uses
Zirconium stearate is used as a raw material for waterproofing materials and emulsion stabilizers.

Also used as a flattening agent.

References

Stearates
Zirconium compounds